Nachbaur is a German surname. Notable people with the surname include:

Don Nachbaur (born 1959), Canadian ice hockey player
Franz Nachbaur (1835–1902), German opera singer
Ryan Nachbaur (born 2004),
Semi pro Console Rust player

See also
Ernst Stahl-Nachbaur (1886–1960), German actor
20288 Nachbaur, a main-belt asteroid

German-language surnames